Carmen Scardine (1910 – May 15, 1964) was an American football wingback who played one season with the Chicago Cardinals of the National Football League.

References

External links
Just Sports Stats

1910 births
1964 deaths
American football running backs
Chicago Cardinals players
Players of American football from Chicago